Lipotidae is a family of river dolphins containing the possibly extinct baiji of China and the fossil genus Parapontoporia from the Late Miocene and Pliocene of the Pacific coast of North America. The genus Prolipotes, which is based on a mandible fragment from Neogene coastal deposits in Guangxi, China, has been classified as an extinct relative of the baiji, but is dubious.

The putative kentriodontid "Lophocetus" pappus is a possible relative of Lipotidae.

Genera and Species
 †(?) Lipotes
 †(?) Lipotes vexillifer 
 Parapontoporia
 P. pacifica
 P. sternbergi
 P. wilsoni
 Prolipotes
 P. yujiangensis

References

 https://nhpbs.org/wild/lipotidae.asp

Mammal families
Toothed whales